Mullins is a city in Marion County, South Carolina, United States. As of the 2010 census, the city population was 4,663.

Incorporated on March 4, 1872, Mullins was named after Col. William S. Mullins, who served as a representative for Marion County in the South Carolina State Legislature from 1852 to 1866.

History

On March 4, 1872, the charter was approved for the town of Mullins. The same year the Macedonia Methodist church was established, the first church within city limits.  By 1878, the city of Mullins had a population of 75 people, a total of 12 families.  There were only three stores and four unpaved streets: Railroad, Main, Smith, and Gapway Streets. Gapway Road was designed from 76 Hwy in 1933.

In 1894, the growth and sale of tobacco sparked the further development of the city of Mullins. At one time, the town was the largest tobacco producing/marketing industry in the United States. Mullins became the largest distributor of tobacco in the country, known as "South Carolina's Largest, The world's best tobacco market." In the late 1920s the tobacco festival was started and is still celebrated today. The tobacco festival is known as the 'Golden Leaf Festival."

Mullins' first school was established in 1872, which was attended by boys and girls from the town, nearby rural areas, and neighboring counties.  The first schoolhouse was built in 1904; a brick, two-story building on Academy Street.  A second schoolhouse was built in 1913, on the corner of Main and Academy streets.  Mullins High School was built in 1923 on North Park Street where it stood until burning in 1976.  It was rebuilt close to the old Marion highway, outside of the city limits. McCormick Elementary School was built on Sandy Bluff Road in 1956. The original Palmetto School for Negroes (High and Elementary) was built on Cypress Street in 1919 and around 1956 was split up.  The Palmetto Elementary School was built on Broad Street.  The Palmetto High School was built on O'Neal Street with 1970 being the last graduating class.  It became Palmetto Middle School as it remains today. In 1970 all schools were combined into a fully integrated school system.

In 1910, the public library was established.  The current library, located at the corner of N. Main and Wine Streets, was built in 1940.

The A.H. Buchan Company Building, Dillard Barn, Imperial Tobacco Company Building, Liberty Warehouse, Mt. Olive Baptist Church, Mullins Commercial Historic District, Neal and Dixon's Warehouse, Old Brick Warehouse, Rasor and Clardy Company Building, and J.C. Teasley House are listed on the National Register of Historic Places.

Geography
Mullins is located at  (34.205239, -79.255309).

Demographics

2020 Census

As of the 2020 United States census, there were 4,026 people, 1,535 households, and 930 families residing in the city.

2000 Census
As of the census of 2000, there were 5,029 people, 2,001 households, and 1,324 families residing in the city. The population density was 1,647.8 people per square mile (636.6/km2). There were 2,312 housing units at an average density of 757.6/sq mi (292.7/km2). The racial makeup of the city was 61.58% African American, 36.59% White,  0.28% Native American, 0.68% Asian, 0.12% from other races, and 0.76% from two or more races. Hispanic or Latino of any race were 0.93% of the population.

There were 2,001 households, out of which 29.3% had children under the age of 18 living with them, 33.1% were married couples living together, 29.1% had a female householder with no husband present, and 33.8% were non-families. 31.1% of all households were made up of individuals, and 14.5% had someone living alone who was 65 years of age or older. The average household size was 2.46 and the average family size was 3.08.

In the city, the population was spread out, with 27.6% under the age of 18, 8.8% from 18 to 24, 23.5% from 25 to 44, 23.2% from 45 to 64, and 16.9% who were 65 years of age or older. The median age was 38 years. For every 100 females, there were 73.2 males. For every 100 females age 18 and over, there were 65.5 males.

The median income for a household in the city was $20,154, and the median income for a family was $25,218. Males had a median income of $26,233 versus $16,572 for females. The per capita income for the city was $12,183. About 25.3% of families and 28.7% of the population were below the poverty line, including 44.2% of those under age 18 and 20.0% of those age 65 or over.

Government 
The city is run by an elected  Mayor-council government system.

The first Mullins Fire Department was established in the early 1920s. The first fire wagon was a regular farm wagon with a ladder and twenty to thirty buckets hanging from the sides. The wagon was pulled by manpower and the equipment was operated by the first men who arrived to help.

Education
Mullins  has a public library, a branch of the Marion County Library System.

Notable people
 Edgar L. McGowan, Commissioner of South Carolina Department of Labor
 Joseph O. Rogers, Jr., politician born in Mullins in 1921
 Terrell Grice, Producer, Singer-songwriter, and YouTuber

References

External links
 The Greater Mullins Chamber of Commerce
 Sci-Way Article: Historic Mullins, SC
 South Carolina Tobacco Museum
 City history
 City website

Cities in South Carolina
Cities in Marion County, South Carolina
Populated places established in 1872
1872 establishments in South Carolina